¡Ole! or ¡olé! is a Spanish interjection used to cheer on or praise a performance, especially associated with the audience of bullfighting and flamenco dance, but common in many other contexts in Spain. In football, it can be used as a form of mockery or encouragement depending on how it is used, and it is also frequently used as a football chant (outside Spain) as in "Olé, Olé, Olé".

Etymology
The origin of the word  is uncertain. A popular idea is that the word comes from "Allāh", the Arabic word for God, perhaps as "wa Ilâh" (by God), or "yāllāh" (O God). It was believed that the presence and power of God could be glimpsed through an exceptional performance, for example in a flamenco dance.  It has also been argued that when Flamenco dancers chant the word in cante jondo, they were reciting the beginning of the Shahada ("la illaha illa Allah") and that they were performing a Muwashshah. The linguist Joan Coromines in his Diccionario crítico etimológico castellano e hispánico links "olé" to the Spanish word for "hello" hola and hala. Hola has also been proposed to have come from Arabic. However, the suggested derivations from Arabic of both olé and hola are disputed and they are described by the Spanish Arabist Federico Corriente as "falsos arabismos" (false Arabisms) in his work Diccionario de arabismos y voces afines en iberorromance. The Spanish dictionary Diccionario de la lengua española that stated the "wa Ilâh" origin of "olé" in its earlier editions has removed the claim since 2001.

The word is also proposed to have originated from Greek ὀλολυγή (ololigi) to describe a "ritual cry", which became Hispanicized into "olé" meaning "bravo!" and used to express an appreciation of an outstanding performance in Spanish. However, the word is attested to only once in Ancient Greek, derived From verb meaning disastrous, with negative connotations and not used repeatedly as is the current practice, nor are there any records of it ever being used a in a similar fashion to express admiration or satisfaction in Greek the way it is currently used in Spanish.
 
The word is paroxytone, though sporadically it can be oxytone (then written olé). The word is believed to have deep root in Andalusia and from there it spread to Madrid, and the acute accent in "olé" may be more proper in Andalusian and flamenco.

Use in flamenco

In flamenco music and dance, shouts of "olé" often accompany the dancer during the performance as encouragement or praise, and at the end of the performance. A singer in cante jondo may also emphasize the word "olé" with melismatic turns.

Use in sport

Bullfighting
In bullfighting, "olé" is commonly shouted spontaneously by the crowds as a cry of approval in response to a matador's performance. The spectators may cheer on a series of moves (such as s and ) performed by the bullfighter, with each move greeted with an "olé".

Football  
The word Olé has also become associated with other sports since the 20th century. In association football, "Olé" as an interjection as used in bullfighting is believed to be first used in Brazil for Garrincha in 1958. The word may be chanted by a crowd for a team or player who made an exceptional performance, and it may be used to demean the opposition when their own team put on a dominant performance.

Since the 1980s, it is commonly used in football in the form of the "Olé, Olé, Olé" chant, which is sung to a tune rather than the series of isolated spoken exclamations as used in bullfighting. A similar form was heard in Spain in league game in 1982, and this version quickly spread to other clubs. This form was first sung in San Sebastián as "Campeones, hobe, hobe, hobe" (hobe means "the best" in Basque) when Real Sociedad won the 1982 La Liga title, but sung in other parts of Spain as "Oé, Oé, Oé", and in other European countries outside of Spain as "Ole, Ole, Ole".

The current popular version of the "Olé, Olé, Olé" chant, however, was first used in a Belgian song "Anderlecht Champion"  initially as "Allez, Allez, Allez, Allez" in French, which morphed into the Spanish "Olé, Olé, Olé, Olé" in a version of the song used for the 1986 FIFA World Cup, hosted in Mexico.  This version of the chant quickly spread and is now commonly used by fans in association football worldwide; for example, has been used by the supporters of the Republic of Ireland national football team. The chant is also used by fans of other sport, such as the hockey team Montreal Canadiens at the Bell Centre and the Welsh rugby union. This chant has also been used in non-sporting events around the world.

References

External links
Ole, Allah and all Claim for the etymology of olé from Allaah (Allah, God)

Spanish words and phrases